The 2007 Biante Touring Car Masters was an Australian motor racing series for automobiles that were visual period replicas of models that competed in Australian Touring Car racing prior to 31 December 1973. Eligible cars were required to comply with Group 3D Sports Sedan regulations and with the additional provisions of the 2007 Touring Car Masters Technical Regulations.

The series, which was the inaugural Touring Car Masters, was won by Steve Mason driving a Chevrolet Camaro. Class B was won by Mick Wilson driving a Chrysler VH Valiant Charger R/T.

Schedule

The series was contested over eight rounds with each round comprising three races:

Series standings

References

Touring Car Masters
Touring Car Masters